The University of Tennessee Athletic Council, chaired by Professor Nathan Dougherty, officially suspended varsity football during the World War I years of 1917 and 1918 because the majority of the players were called into military service. In addition, Coach John R. Bender was enlisted as an instructor at Camp John Sevier in Greenville, South Carolina.

During this period without varsity football, two unofficial teams were formed from Army recruits and students. One team represented a training unit called the Fighting Mechanics and the other represented the Student Army Training Corps (SATC).

Schedule

References

Tennessee
Tennessee Volunteers football seasons
Tennessee (SATC) football